Miša Marinček (born 18 February 1985) is a Slovenian retired handball player.

With Slovenia national team, she participated at the 2016 European Women's Handball Championship.

References

1985 births
Living people
Sportspeople from Celje
Slovenian female handball players
Expatriate handball players
Slovenian expatriate sportspeople in Austria
Mediterranean Games competitors for Slovenia
Competitors at the 2005 Mediterranean Games
Competitors at the 2009 Mediterranean Games